Gláucio Jose de Araujo Silva (born 3 February 1994) is a Brazilian footballer who plays as a forward.

Career
Gláucio signed with Bulgarian club Dunav Ruse on 11 July 2018 on a two-year deal.

On 30 January 2019, Gláucio signed for Armenian Premier League club FC Alashkert on a contract until the summer of 2020.

References

External links
 
 Gláucio at ZeroZero

1994 births
Living people
Brazilian footballers
Association football forwards
América Futebol Clube (RN) players
Treze Futebol Clube players
Globo Futebol Clube players
Oeste Futebol Clube players
FC Dunav Ruse players
FC Alashkert players
Nova Iguaçu Futebol Clube players
CE Operário Várzea-Grandense players
St. Lucia F.C. players
Associação Atlética de Altos players
Campeonato Brasileiro Série B players
Campeonato Brasileiro Série C players
Campeonato Brasileiro Série D players
First Professional Football League (Bulgaria) players
Armenian Premier League players
Maltese Premier League players
Brazilian expatriate footballers
Brazilian expatriate sportspeople in Bulgaria
Brazilian expatriate sportspeople in Armenia
Brazilian expatriate sportspeople in Malta
Expatriate footballers in Bulgaria
Expatriate footballers in Armenia
Expatriate footballers in Malta
People from Natal, Rio Grande do Norte
Sportspeople from Rio Grande do Norte